Arturo Eduardo Fajardo Bustamante (born 17 July 1961 in Aiguá, Maldonado Department) is a Uruguayan Roman Catholic cleric.

Biography
Fajardo was ordained priest on 8 May 1988 by Pope John Paul II during his second visit to Uruguay.

He was appointed Bishop of San José de Mayo on 27 June 2007.

Since 2013 he is the Vice President of the Episcopal Conference of Uruguay.

In April 2019, he was elected as President of the Episcopal Conference, and on 15 June 2020, Pope Francis appointed him as Bishop of Salto.

References

External links

1961 births
People from Maldonado Department
Bishops appointed by Pope Benedict XVI
21st-century Roman Catholic bishops in Uruguay
Living people
Roman Catholic bishops of Salto
Roman Catholic bishops of San José de Mayo